The Division 1 Féminine Player of the Month is an association football award that recognises the best adjudged Division 1 Féminine player each month of the season.

The award was created by French Football Federation in September 2020 with the support of league's title sponsors Arkema and television right holders Canal+. It is currently known as D1 Arkema Player of the Month due to sponsorship reasons. In October 2021, UNFP joined other sponsors to become a partner of the trophy. The winner is chosen by a combination of online public vote and the players of each Division 1 Féminine clubs, contributing 50% each to the final tally.

Winners

Multiple winners
The table below lists those who have won the award on more than one occasion.

As of December 2022 award

Awards won by club

Awards won by nationality

Awards won by position

Miscellaneous
 Kadidiatou Diani, Marie-Antoinette Katoto and Nadia Nadim of Paris Saint-Germain were the nominees for November 2020. This was the only instance when all three nominees were from the same club.

All-time table
As of December 2022 award

Notes

References

External links
 

Awards established in 2020
Association football player of the month awards
Association football player non-biographical articles
Association football in France lists
Women's association football trophies and awards
2020 establishments in France